This is the list of the schools in Dubai owned by the Dubai Government - Public Schools.

KHDA ratings of Public Dubai schools are listed below. The list is arranged by ratings for the year 2010–2011; within each rating level schools are listed alphabetically.

Data collected from KHDA News report.

Official Reports can be found at KHDA site.

References

External links 
 KHDA website 
 KHDA website 
 Teacher Jobs in Dubai, Sharjah, Abu Dhabi, Al Ain, Ras Al Khaimah, Ajman, Fujairah

Education in Dubai